Métamorphoses (Transformations) is a 2014 French drama film written and directed by Christophe Honoré and starring Amira Akili, Sébastien Hirel, Damien Chapelle, Mélodie Richard and George Babluani. 

The film consists of a linked series of reworkings (in present-day settings) of episodes from the narrative poem of the same name by the Roman poet Ovid. It was screened in the Venice Days section at the 71st Venice International Film Festival.

Synopsis 
Leaving her school, a young woman meets a handsome but strange young man. Attracted by the stories he tells her, she is fascinated by tales of gods and young mortals. The film recounts the encounter first of Jupiter and Europe, with the male god in the form of seducer, pygmalion, initiator. Bacchus then illustrates the necessity to believe in the myths of gods, or else to suffer for one's impiety. Lastly there is Orpheus and his proselytism, his teaching and his prophecy; a sect groups itself around him up to his violent death. The stories are linked by Europe, a young women who grows through experiencing the worlds of these three characters, watching, following them from her state of innocence.

Cast 
 Matthis Lebrun as Actéon 
 Samantha Avrillaud as Diane 
 Amira Akili as Europe 
 Sébastien Hirel as Jupiter
 Mélodie Richard as Junon
 Coralie Rouet as Io 
 Nadir Sönmez as Mercure  
 Vincent Massimino as Argus
 Olivier Müller as Pan
 Myriam Guizani as Syrinx
 Gabrielle Chuiton as Baucis
 Jean Courte as Philémon
 Rachid O as Tirésias
 Arthur Jacquin as Narcisse
 Damien Chapelle as Bacchus
 Julien Antonini as the hermaphrodite
 Marlène Saldana as Salmacis
 Yannick Guyomard as Penthée
 Jimmy Lenoir as Cadmus
 George Babluani as Orphée
 Vimala Pons as Atalante
 Erwan Ha-Kyoon Larcher as Hippomène
 Keti Bicolli as Venus

Production 
Filming took place between 13 May and June 2013. The film was shot in Nîmes, Montpellier and surrounding areas.

Music
The sound track includes sections of Mozart's overture to Zaide, Schoenberg's Verklärte Nacht, Webern's String Quartet op.5, Ravel's Rapsodie Espagnole and Daphnis et Chloé, and several works by Baxter Dury.

See also

 Cultural influence of Metamorphoses
 List of French films of 2014

References

External links 
 

2010s French-language films
Films based on Metamorphoses
Films directed by Christophe Honoré
2010s French films
Films set in France